LATAM Cargo can refer to a number of airlines, all members of the LATAM Airlines Group, based in Santiago, Chile, with subsidiaries across the rest of Latin America:

LATAM Cargo Brasil
LATAM Cargo Chile
LATAM Cargo Colombia
LATAM Cargo Mexico